Bozrah Congregational Church and Parsonage is a historic church and parsonage at 17 and 23 Bozrah Street in Bozrah, Connecticut.  The church, built in 1843, is a well-preserved example of churches transitional between Federal period meeting house architecture and 19th-century Greek Revival church architecture.  The property was added to the National Register of Historic Places in 1991.

Architecture and history
The Bozrah Congregational Church is located near the village center of Bozrah, on the west side of Bozrah Street overlooking Fitchville Pond.  The church is a rectangular -story wood-frame structure, with a gabled roof and clapboarded exterior.  Paneled pilasters rise at the building corners to an entablature that encircles the building, and the front-facing gable is fully pedimented. A two-stage belltower is capped by a round cupola and weathervane.  The front facade is three bays wide, articulated by pilasters, with entrances in each of the outer bays.  The interior is simply finished, with bench pews.  The parsonage, a Victorian frame house built in 1872, stands a few hundred feet to the south.

The church congregation was established in 1737, when the area was still part of Norwich.  Its first meeting house was also used for civic affairs after the town was incorporated in 1786.  In the early 1840s the congregation debated repairing or replacing its old meeting house, eventually deciding to construct this building, which was completed sufficiently to be used in 1843.  Architecturally, it follows in the tradition of older meeting houses in its form and interior, albeit with Greek Revival style popular at the time.

See also
National Register of Historic Places listings in New London County, Connecticut

References

Bozrah, Connecticut
Churches on the National Register of Historic Places in Connecticut
Houses on the National Register of Historic Places in Connecticut
Greek Revival architecture in Connecticut
Churches completed in 1843
19th-century United Church of Christ church buildings
United Church of Christ churches in Connecticut
Churches in New London County, Connecticut
National Register of Historic Places in New London County, Connecticut
1843 establishments in Connecticut
Houses in New London County, Connecticut